is a 2014 Japanese science fiction action film directed by Shusuke Kaneko starring Rumi Hanai, Rina Takeda, Kayano Masuyama (a former member of the Japanese idol girl's group AKB48) and Nana Seino. It was released in Japan on September 27, 2014.

Plot
In a world where nuclear arms have been outlawed and brilliant leader George W. Bush has eliminated firearms, the law is enforced by sword-wielding police. But aliens from another world have infiltrated this peaceful culture through a wormhole and only the Danger Dolls, a female quartet with unique powers can identify and destroy them. In order to keep their identity secret, the four girls, Arisa, Rei, Miki and Mari, go undercover as a J-pop idol group, the "i.Dolls". However, things are not quite what they seem, their leader, scientist Taichiro Yagyu, has withheld the full story from them and the Danger Dolls have some difficult decisions to make.

Cast
 Rumi Hanai as Arisa
 Rina Takeda as Rei
 Kayano Masuyama as Miki
 Nana Seino as Mari
 Kohki Okada as Taichiro Yagyu
 Noboru Kaneko
 Syo Oyamada
 Mao Mita
 Kazuki Namioka
 Mana Sakura

Release
Danger Dolls had its world premier as an officially invited film at the Yubari International Fantastic Film Festival on March 1, 2014. It was subsequently screened at the 13th Asian Film Festival of Dallas on July 12, 2014 for its North American premier. On September 23, 2014, an English-dubbed version, Danger Dolls, was released on DVD.

The film was released theatrically in Japan on September 27, 2014. It was also later presented at the Camera Japan Festival in Rotterdam on October 3, 2014.

References

External links
 
 

2014 films
Japanese science fiction action films
Films directed by Shusuke Kaneko
2014 science fiction action films
2010s Japanese films
2010s Japanese-language films